Success is a 2003 Indian Tamil drama film written and directed by Suresh Prasanna. The film featured newcomer Dushyanth in the lead role, a grandson of actor Sivaji Ganesan, while Sonia Agarwal and Nandhana played supporting roles. The film released in September 2003 to average reviews from critics.

Cast

Production
Producer Issaki Sundar saw Dushyanth, the son of Ramkumar Ganesan and grandson of Sivaji Ganesan, at the Sivaji Productions office and offered him the opportunity to make his acting debut. After initially rejecting the offer, he ultimately agreed after consulting with his uncle Prabhu and cousin Vikram Prabhu. Dushyanth was also credited as Junior Sivaji during the production of the film. The film was named Success, after the first on screen dialogue of Sivaji from the film Parasakthi (1952).

Release
The film opened to mixed reviews with a critic noting "the movie surprises us with a nice turn of events. It definitely energizes the movie and gets us interested again. Looking back on the first half after this, we realize that the movie has actually been quite clever in setting up stock characters but in a slightly different way that makes the twist surprising." Another reviewer noted "To sum up 'Success' is not the right film for Jr Ganesan to be successful."

Soundtrack
Music was composed by Deva, while lyrics were written by Vaali, Kabilan, Snehan and Viveka.

References

2003 films
2000s Tamil-language films